Jude Herrera is an American actress. She began her career in theater and made her onscreen debut in the CBS television movie, Blue Rodeo (1996), with Ann-Margret and Kris Kristofferson.

Filmography

Film

Television

Stage
End Town (1995) by Dante Ventresca - Role: Allegra - Directed by Thor Steingraber - Nailing The Kipper Presents Theatre Company - Hollywood Moguls Theatre, Los Angeles
Bellyfruit (1996) by Maria Bernhard, Janet Borrus, Susannah Blinkoff and Kristen Scheimer - Role: Araceli - Directed by Kerri Green - Los Angeles Theatre Center Main Stage

Awards and nominations

References

External links
 

American film actresses
American stage actresses
American television actresses
Actresses from New Mexico
Living people
Year of birth missing (living people)
21st-century American women